Henry 'Swin' Jackson (born c. 1850) was an English football secretary-manager and director. He joined West Bromwich Albion's first board of directors in 1891. He served the club as general secretary-manager from 1892 to 1894, remaining as a director for much of that period. Jackson later joined Leicester Fosse as secretary. He died in 1930.

References

External links

1930 deaths
English football managers
West Bromwich Albion F.C. managers
Leicester City F.C. managers
Year of birth unknown
1850s births